Maya Sondhi (born  1983) is a British actress and screenwriter. She was born in Birmingham, England. She attended the National Youth Theatre before going on to study at LAMDA. She is the creator and writer of D.I Ray.  As an actress she has appeared in Line of Duty and Citizen Khan.

Television

Screenwriting

References

External links

Living people
British television actresses
Place of birth missing (living people)
British people of Indian descent
British women screenwriters
British television writers
British women television writers
21st-century British actresses
21st-century British women writers
Alumni of the London Academy of Music and Dramatic Art
Actresses from Birmingham, West Midlands
Writers from Birmingham, West Midlands
21st-century British screenwriters
21st-century English women
21st-century English people
Year of birth missing (living people)